Weber House may refer to:

in the United States
(by state)
Weber House (Russell, Arkansas), listed on the National Register of Historic Places (NRHP) in Arkansas
Robert Weber Round Barn, Durand, Illinois, NRHP-listed
Howard K. Weber House, Springfield, Illinois, listed on the NRHP in Illinois
Weber House (Guttenberg, Iowa), listed on the NRHP in Iowa
Alois and Annie Weber House, Keokuk, Iowa, NRHP-listed
John Weber Farm, Camp Springs, Kentucky, listed on the NRHP in Kentucky
Martin Weber House, Saint Paul, Minnesota, NRHP-listed
Weber-Weaver Farm, West Lampeter, Pennsylvania, NRHP-listed
Weber-Schuchert House, Victoria, Texas, listed on the NRHP in Texas
Jacob Weber House, Wisconsin Dells, Wisconsin, listed on the NRHP in Wisconsin

See also
Webber House (disambiguation)